Ouarégou is a town in the Garango Department of Boulgou Province in south-eastern Burkina Faso. As of 2005, the town has a population of 9,090.

Ouarégou is a canton with 15 villages :

1. Ouarégou-Center

2. Bangoula

3. Dissiam

4. Ouarégou-Peulh

5. Topra

6. Gozére

7. Kouassagou

8. Bangou

9. Saregou

10.Tengsoba

11.Tourla

12.Kienga

13.Mogao

14. Gnabtenga

15.Wanga

References

Populated places in the Centre-Est Region
Boulgou Province